The canton of Commentry is an administrative division in central France. At the French canton reorganisation which came into effect in March 2015, the canton was expanded from 4 to 24 communes:
 
Beaune-d'Allier
Bézenet
Blomard
Chamblet
Chappes
Chavenon
Colombier
Commentry
Deneuille-les-Mines
Doyet
Hyds
Louroux-de-Beaune
Malicorne  
Montmarault
Montvicq
Murat
Saint-Angel
Saint-Bonnet-de-Four
Saint-Marcel-en-Murat
Saint-Priest-en-Murat
Sazeret
Verneix
Vernusse
Villefranche-d'Allier

Demographics

See also
Cantons of the Allier department 
Communes of France

References

Cantons of Allier